The following is the final results of the Iranian Volleyball Super League (Velayat Cup) 2002/03 season.

Standings

 2003 Asian Club Championship was canceled due to the outbreak of SARS.

References 
 volleyball.ir 
 Parssport

League 2002-03
Iran Super League, 2002-03
Iran Super League, 2002-03
Volleyball League, 2002-03
Volleyball League, 2002-03